Moscow Highway may refer to one of the following.
M10 highway (Russia), highway Moscow-St.Petersburg
 Moscow Highway, Belarus, highway Minsk-Moscow